Jerome G. Kelsh (born October 25, 1940) is an American politician from North Dakota. He was a member of the North Dakota House of Representatives, representing the 26th district. A Democrat, he was first elected in 2007. He also sat in the North Dakota State Senate from 1984 to 2002. 

Kelsh is an alumnus of University of North Dakota and is a farmer and retired businessman.

References

Living people
1940 births
People from LaMoure County, North Dakota
People from Dickey County, North Dakota
University of North Dakota alumni
21st-century American politicians
Democratic Party members of the North Dakota House of Representatives